Martin may either be a given name or surname. In Scotland, Martin or McMartin is a common surname of Scottish Gaelic origin. Martin is, however, more common as a masculine given name in many languages and cultures. It comes from the Latin name Martinus, which is a late derived form of the name of the Roman god Mars, protective godhead of the Latins and, therefore, god of war. The meaning is usually rendered in reference to the god as "of Mars", or "of war/warlike" ("martial").

It has remained a popular given name in Christian times, in honor of Saint Martin of Tours. Along with its historic Catholic popularity, it has also been popular among Protestants due to Martin Luther. In addition, African American children are often given the name in honor of Martin Luther King Jr.

Martin, along with a range of variant forms mostly of patronymic origin, borne by families descended from someone with the given name of Martin, are seen throughout Europe, though in some instances the Martin surname in England are instead of toponymic origin, coming from one of numerous places called Merton. Martin is the most common French surname and also frequent in Belgium.

The name Martin in different regions

United States
Martin was the sixteenth most frequently reported surname in the 1990 United States Census, accounting for 0.27% of the population.

Europe
The name is often read as Martin (with `on the i) in most slavic nations. Nicknames for Martin can be Marti, Marto, Martine, Maťo, Maťko, Martinko.

Britain
 England

Before the Normans arrived in the 11th century, "Martin" was rare in England. See feudal barony of Barnstaple for the post-Conquest Anglo-Norman family. The surname became common south of the Thames.

 Scotland
There are several groups of Martins or Macmartins in Scotland. The MacMartins of Letterfinlay appear to have allied themselves to the Clan Cameron in the late 14th century and finally merged with the Camerons after the Battle of Lochaber in 1429. The MacMartins, who became a sept of Clan Cameron, is said to have been amongst the most loyal and valuable followers of Cameron of Lochiel. In the Jacobite rising of 1745, the MacMartins were "out with" Lochiel's regiment. According to the Oxford Companion to Scottish History, the MacMartins of Letterfinlay who were a sept of the Clan Cameron would have seen themselves as distinct within their own lands, but would have also seen themselves as Camerons if operating elsewhere outside of Lochaber.

There is a branch of MacMartins from Strathclyde. The Martins in Skye are traditionally associated with Clan Donald, and the Lothians were home to a powerful "de St Martin" family from the 12th century.

 Wales
An Anglo-Norman knight named Robert Fitz Martin, born in the late 11th century, settled in England's West Country, on lands inherited from a grandfather, and later participated in the invasions of Wales, where he was awarded the barony of Cemaes, located between Fishguard and Cardigan. Robert fitz Martin established the caput of his barony at Nanhyfer or Nevern. Robert's son William Fitz Robert Fitz Martin (born c. 1155) inherited the family's property and re-established family control over Cemaes, which had been lost to the Welsh. The senior line became extinct in 1326, but cadet lines still flourish in Wales and England.

Bulgaria 
Martin is a highly common first name in Bulgaria. The name is consistancy the third most popular baby name. In surname form Martin becomes Martinov, thought it's not popular. The name is pronounced the same as English.

France
With over 230,000 people holding the surname Martin in France, it is the most common French surname. The origins of its frequency can be attributed to Saint Martin of Tours, who was the most popular French saint, but the reason is not clear.

Martin was never a common given name (Christian name) in the Middle Ages, unlike Bernard or Thomas (which were later officialized and became common surnames, nowadays ranking second and third respectively). Onomastics have tried to find other reasons for Martin's popularity, by examining, for example, the repartition of place names, but this explanation also lacks empirical support.

It can be a late surname connected with children of orphanages, like Alexandre, which was never a common first name in the Middle Ages but now appears quite frequently as a surname. Martin can represent charity towards orphans.

However, this list hides strong regional differences in France and the increasing number of foreign names among the French citizens. Table based on births between 1966 and 1990:

Estonia
Martin is a common male name in Estonia - it was the most popular male given name throughout the 1990s. The name currently remains as the second most popular male name in Estonia.

Martin is also a surname – in the variations of Martin, Martinsen, Martinson.

Hungary
Márton, the Hungarian form of the name, is commonly used as both a first name and surname.

Ireland

Surnames in Ireland are attested from the mid-10th century. Several distinct families featured the name as a surname element. They included Mac Giolla Mhártain, Ó Maol Mhartain, Ó Martain, Ó Máirtín, Mac Máirtín, Mac Máel Martain. Individuals included Echmílid mac Máel Martain (Bishop of Down to 1202), Giolla Ernain Ó Martain (Irish poet and Chief Ollam of Ireland, died 1218), and Fearghal Ó Martain, O.E.S.A. (Bishop of Killala from 1425 to 1432).

After the Norman invasion of Ireland in 1169, numerous unrelated bearers of the name settled in Ireland. Among the most well-known of the name were one of the Tribes of Galway.

Italy
In Italy, Martin is a rather common surname in Veneto, Friuli-Venezia Giulia, and Piedmont.

Poland
In Poland, the name is written as "Marcin".

Portugal
In Portugal, Martin is written "Martim" or Martinho. One famous Martin from Portuguese history is Martim Moniz.

Scandinavia
Martin is common as a given name in all three Scandinavian countries, and is a typically a top-ranking name in popularity, on any given year. Also it is seen in derivative surnames following Scandinavian naming tradition, such as Martinsen (in Norway and Denmark) and Martinsson (in Sweden). Morten is a Scandinavian version of Martin.

Spain
Martín is a common given name and is also among the most common surnames in Spain. Its Catalan variant is Martí and in Galician is Martiño. Jewish families in medieval Spain (Sephardic) Jews who remained in Spain and agreed to accept Christianity were asked to change their surnames. One of the names taken up by these Jewish conversos (originally known in Spain as Marranos, but preferred term is 'anusim' which is Hebrew for "forced") was "Martí" (also spelt "Marty"). Sephardic Jews also used Martín or Martínez, as a variation from the Hebrew name Mordecai.

Geographical distribution
As of 2014, 32.6% of all known bearers of the surname Martin were residents of the United States (frequency 1:424), 19.2% of Spain (1:93), 12.0% of France (1:211), 4.7% of England (1:449), 3.5% of Canada (1:401), 2.9% of Germany (1:1,054), 2.3% of Argentina (1:719), 2.2% of the Philippines (1:1,731), 2.2% of Mexico (1:2,179), 2.1% of Tanzania (1:955), 2.0% of Australia (1:453), 1.5% of Cuba (1:303) and 1.3% of South Africa (1:1,617).

In Spain, the frequency of the surname was higher than national average (1:93) in the following autonomous communities:

 Castile and León (1:35)
 Canary Islands (1:45)
 Extremadura (1:56)
 Community of Madrid (1:63)
 Andalusia (1:74)
 Castilla-La Mancha (1:79)

In France, the frequency of the surname was higher than national average (1:211) in the following regions:

 Collectivity of Saint Martin (1:37)
 Saint Barthélemy (1:143)
 Bourgogne-Franche-Comté (1:152)
 Centre-Val de Loire (1:168)
 Pays de la Loire (1:171)
 Nouvelle-Aquitaine (1:183)
 Auvergne-Rhône-Alpes (1:184)
 Grand Est (1:193)
 Provence-Alpes-Côte d'Azur (1:196)
 Normandy (1:200)

Surname
Notable people sharing the surname "Martin" include:

Born before 1700
Francis Martin (priest) (1652–1722), Irish Augustinian
John Martin (1692–1767), British Member of Parliament for Tewkesbury, 1741–1747
Martin Martin (1660–1718), Scottish writer and explorer of the Hebrides
Peter Martin (STP) (died 1645), Master of Sacred Theology
Richard Martin fitz Oliver (c. 1602–48), Irish Confederate
Robert fitz Martin (c. 1095 – c. 1159), Anglo-Norman knight, first Lord of Cemais, Wales
Giolla Ernain Ó Martain (died 1218), chief brehon of law in Ireland
Saint Richard Martin (died 1588), English martyr
Richard Martin (Lord Mayor of London) (died 1617), Master of the Mint and Lord Mayor of London
Richard Martin (Recorder of London) (1570–1618), lawyer and Recorder of London
Richard Óge Martyn (1602–1648) leading member of Confederate Ireland
Robert Martin (disambiguation), several people
William Martin (disambiguation), several people
Martin Baronets:
Sir Roger Martin, 1st Baronet (1639–1712), 1st Martin Baronet of Long Melford
Sir Roger Martin, 2nd Baronet (1667–1742), 2nd Martin Baronet of Long Melford
Sir Roger Martin, 3rd Baronet (1689–1762), 3rd Martin Baronet of Long Melford

Born 1700–1799
Alexander Martin (1740–1807), American politician
Christian Frederick Martin (1796–1873), German guitar builder, founder of C.F. Martin & Company
Claude Martin (1735–1800), French adventurer, soldier, and founder of three schools
Claude Martin Wade (1794–1861), British colonel named after the French adventurer Claude Martin
George Martin (Royal Navy officer) (1764–1847), Royal Navy admiral of the fleet
James Martin (1738–1810), British banker and politician
John Martin (1724–1794), British Member of Parliament for Tewkesbury, 1754–1761
John Martin (painter) (1789–1854), English painter
Joseph Martin (1726–1776), British banker and politician
Joseph Martin (general) (1740–1808), American Revolutionary War officer, explorer, Indian agent, planter
Joseph Plumb Martin (1760–1850), American Revolutionary War soldier, diarist
Joshua L. Martin (1799–1856), American politician, Governor of Alabama
Josiah Martin (1737–1786), ninth and last British governor of North Carolina from 1771 to 1776 
Luther Martin (1748–1826), American politician
Sir Mordaunt Martin, 4th Baronet (1740–1815), 4th Martin Baronet of Long Melford
Pierre Martin (French Navy officer) (1752–1820), French naval officer and admiral
Richard Martin (Irish politician) (1754–1834), Irish politician and founder of the RSPCA
Richard Martin (cricketer) (born 1789, date of death unknown), English cricketer
Robert N. Martin (1798–1870), American judge
Sir Roger Martin, 5th Baronet (1778–1815), 5th Martin Baronet of Long Melford
Wheeler Martin (1765–1836), justice of the Rhode Island Supreme Court
William Martin (disambiguation), several people, including
William Martin (naturalist) (1767–1810), English naturalist and palaeontologist
William Charles Linnaeus Martin (1798–1864), English naturalist

Born 1800–1899
Allen Martin (1844–1924), founder of Port Adelaide Grammar School
Alphonse Martin (1884–1947), Canadian musician
Alphonse-Fortunat Martin (1849–1905), Canadian politician
Annie Montgomerie Martin (1841–1918), educator in South Australia
Arthur Martin-Leake (1874–1953), English physician, recipient of the Victoria Cross
Augustus Pearl Martin (1835–1902), American Civil War artillery officer and mayor of Boston, Massachusetts
Bernard F. Martin (1845–1914), New York politician
Blakey Martin (1891–1940), English footballer
Bob Martin (boxer) (1897–1978), American boxer
Celora E. Martin (1834–1909), New York lawyer and politician
Eamon Martin (1961–) Irish Bishop
Édouard-Onésiphore Martin (1841–1889), Canadian politician
Frank Martin (composer) (1890–1974), Swiss composer
Franklin H. Martin (1857–1935), American physician
Frederick Townsend Martin (1849–1914) American author
Glenn L. Martin (1886–1955), American aviation pioneer, company founder
Harley A. Martin (1880–1951), American politician
James Martin, II, American Medal of Honor recipient
James Purdon Martin (1893–1984), British physician
J. P. Martin (1880–1966), English Methodist minister and writer
Jesse M. Martin (1877–1915), Governor of Arkansas
John W. Martin (1884–1958), American politician, Governor of Florida
Joseph Martin (Canadian politician) (1852–1923), Canadian lawyer and politician
Joseph William Martin, Jr. (1884–1968), American politician, Speaker of the U.S. House of Representatives
Karlheinz Martin (1886–1948), German stage and film director
Lewis J. Martin (1844–1913), American Democratic Party politician
Louis Honore Martin (1895–1920), First World War flying ace 
Mary Martin (missionary) (1892–1975), Irish missionary nun and founder of Medical Missionaries of Mary
Myra Belle Martin (born 1861), American teacher, writer, financier
Paul Sidney Martin (c. 1899–1974), American archaeologist
Peter Martin (Australian footballer) (1875–1918), Australian rules footballer
Peter E. Martin (1882? 1888?–1944), Canadian/American auto industry executive (Ford Motor Co.)
Peter Francis Martin (1867–1937), contractor and political figure in Nova Scotia, Canada
Peter Martin, pen-name of Christine Chaundler (1887–1972), British children's author
Phonney Martin (1845–1933), 19th-century American professional baseball player
Sir Richard Martin, 1st Baronet, of Cappagh (1831–1901), Anglo-Irish baronet and privy counsellor
Sir Richard Martin, 1st Baronet, of Overbury Court (1838–1916), English banker and Liberal Party politician
Robert Martin (Canadian politician) (1858–aft 1924), Canadian Saskatchewan territory politician
Robert Martin (Oklahoma governor) (1833–1897), acting Governor of Oklahoma Territory
Selina Martin (1882 – after 1909), Women's Suffragette from England
Whitmell P. Martin (1867–1929), "Bull Moose" and Democratic U.S. representative from Louisiana
William Alexander Parsons Martin (1827–1916), Protestant missionary in China
William Melville Martin (1876–1970), Canadian politician
William Martin (architect) (1829–1900), Birmingham architect and partner in Martin & Chamberlain

Born 1900–1949
Agnes Martin (1912–2004), Canadian painter
Alberta Martin (1906–2004), Confederate widow
Alphonse Martin (water polo) (born 1930), Belgian water polo player
Anders Martin-Löf (born 1940), Swedish mathematician
Andrea Martin (born 1947), Armenian-American-Canadian actress and comedian
Barney Martin (1923–2005), American actor
Bernice Fenwick Martin (1902–1999), Canadian painter and printmaker
Billy Martin (1928–1989), American baseball player and manager
Bob Martin (singer) (1922–1998), Austrian singer
Bobbi Martin (1943–2000), American musician
Bobby Martin (musician) (1903–1983), American jazz trumpeter
Bobby Martin (producer) (1930–2013), American music producer, arranger and songwriter
Bunsom Martin (1922–2008), Thai medical professional
Caleb Martin (American football) (1924–1994), American football player
Charles A. Martin, Southern-African scout leader
Charlie Martin (1913–1998), English auto driver
Christopher Martin-Jenkins (1945–2013), British cricket journalist
David Martin (poet) (1915–1997), Australian poet
Dean Martin (1917–1995), American singer and actor
Dee Martin (born 1949), American football player
Del Martin and Phyllis Lyon (1921–2008 and 1924–2020), American feminists and gay-rights activists
Denys R. Martin (before 1920–1970), British officer of the Royal Engineers, philatelist
Dewey Martin (musician) (1940–2009), Canadian rock drummer
Dick Martin (artist) (1927–1990), American artist
Dick Martin (comedian) (1922–2008), American comedian
Don Martin (cartoonist) (1931–2000), American cartoonist, MAD Magazine
Donald A. Martin (born 1940), set theorist (mathematician) at UCLA
Dottie Martin (born 1937), First Lady of North Carolina
Ernest Martin (theatre director and manager) (born 1932), American theatre director and manager
Eugene J. Martin (1938–2005), American painter
F. X. Martin (1922–2000), Irish priest and historian
Frank Martin (ice hockey) (1933–2007), Canadian professional ice hockey player
Gene Martin (born 1947), American baseball player
 Sir George Martin (1926–2016), English producer of The Beatles' records; referred to as the fifth Beatle
George R. R. Martin (born 1948), American science fiction and fantasy writer
Glenn Martin (coach) (1906–1997), American college sports coach
Gordon Eugene Martin (born 1925), American physicist and author
Harry S. Martin (born 1943), American librarian and legal scholar
Henno Martin (1910–1998), German geologist
Illa Martin (1900–1988), German dendrologist, botanist, conservationist, and dentist
J. C. Martin (baseball) (born 1936), American baseball player
Jacques Martin (comics) (1921–2010), French comics creator
James Douglas Martin (1918–2017), U.S. representative from Alabama
James G. Martin (born 1935), Governor of North Carolina
James Martin (author) (1933–2013), computer systems design author
Janis Martin (soprano) (1939–2014), American soprano
Jerome Martin (Wisconsin politician) (1908–1977), Wisconsin politician
Jill Martin (actress) (1938–2016), English musical theatre actress
Joan Martin (1933–2019), All-American Girls Professional Baseball League player (1951 season)
John Martin (dance critic), New York Times, active from 1927
 José Martín Quesada (1935–1996), Spanish cyclist
Judith Martin (born 1938), American journalist and etiquette writer ("Miss Manners")
Knox Martin (1923–2022), American abstract expressionist artist, New York City
Leslie H. Martin (1900–1983), Australian physicist and academic
Mac Martin (1925–2022), American bluegrass musician
Malachi Martin (1921–1999), Irish Roman Catholic priest and religious author
Mardik Martin (1936–2019), American screenwriter of Armenian descent
Martin A. Martin (1910–1963), American criminal and civil rights attorney
Mary Martin (1913–1990), American actress and singer
Michael Martin (philosopher) (1932–2015), professor emeritus of philosophy at Boston University
Michael Martin, Baron Martin of Springburn (1945–2018), Speaker of the House of Commons
Mike Martin (baseball coach) (born 1944), American college baseball coach
Millicent Martin (born 1934), English actress and singer
Moon Martin (1945–2020), American singer-songwriter and guitarist
Paul Martin (born 1938), Canadian politician and Prime Minister of Canada 2003–2006
Paul Martin Sr. (1903–1992), Canadian politician and father of Prime Minister Paul Martin
Paul Schultz Martin (1928–2010), American geoscientist
Pauline Martin (born 1952), Canadian film actress
Pauline Martin (baseball) [?], All-American Girls Professional Baseball League player (1946 season)
Peggy Smith Martin (1931–2012), American politician
Pepper Martin (1904–1965), American baseball player
Percy Martin (artist), American printmaker
Peter Martin (disambiguation): several people including:
Peter Martin (actor) (born 1934), British actor
Peter Martin (Canadian football) (c. 1920–1996)
Peter Martin (professor) (born 1940), American professor of English and author
Peter B. Martin (1915–1992), American photographer and publisher
Peter D. Martin (1919–1988), professor and publisher
Philip Martin (pianist) (born 1947), Irish pianist and composer with Aosdána
Philip Martin (screenwriter) (1938–2020), British screenwriter
Pierre Martin (politician) (born 1943), French politician
Quinn Martin (1922–1987), American television producer
Richard Milton Martin (1916–1985), American logician and philosopher
Richard Martin (RKO actor) (1917–1994) American actor
Richard Frewen Martin (1918–2006), British test pilot
Richard Martin (British director) (born 1935), British television director
Richard Martin (curator) (1947–1999), fashion historian, author, and curator of the Metropolitan Museum of Art's Costume Institute
Robert Martin (New Jersey politician) (born 1947), American New Jersey state politician
Rodolfo Martín Villa (born 1934), Spanish politician
Samuel Martin (linguist) (1924–2009), linguist (Korean and Japanese) and designer of the Yale Romanization for Korean
Sheila Martin (born 1943), wife of Canadian Prime Minister Paul Martin
Steve Martin (born 1945), American actor, comedian, musician, and author
Strother Martin (1919–1980), American actor
Sylvia Wene Martin (born 1930), American bowler
Tom Martin (Texas politician) (1949–2018), mayor of Lubbock, Texas
Tony Martin (American singer) (1913–2012), American actor and singer
Tony Martin (farmer) (born 1944), English farmer who shot a burglar
Tony Martin (politician) (born 1948), Canadian politician
Tony Martin (professor) (1942–2013), professor at Wellesley College
Tyrone G. Martin (born 1930), American naval historian
Valerie Martin (born 1948), American novelist
Vince Martin (singer) (1937–2018), American singer
Virginia Tovar Martín (1929–2013), Spanish art historian, author, and professor.
William Martin (disambiguation), many people, including
William McChesney Martin, Jr. (1906–1998), Chairman of the U.S. Federal Reserve
William Martin (mathematician) (1911–2004), American mathematician

Born 1950–1999
Alberto Martín (born 1978), Spanish tennis player
Alexandra Martin (born 1968), French politician
Andrea Martin (musician) (1972–2021), American R&B singer-songwriter
Andrej Martin (born 1989), Slovak tennis player
 Andrew Martin (1975–2009), professional wrestler known as Test (wrestler)
Ann M. Martin (born 1955), American author of The Baby-sitters Club series
Austin Martin (born 1999), American baseball player
Bent Martin (born 1943), Danish footballer, father of Camilla Martin
Billy Martin (guitarist) (born 1981), American guitarist with the band Good Charlotte
Billy Martin (percussionist) (born 1963), American jazz drummer with the band Medeski Martin & Wood
Bobby Martin (American football) (1987–2020), American football player
Brad Martin (1973–2022), American country music singer
Brett Martin (baseball) (born 1995), American baseball player
Caleb Martin (basketball) (born 1995), American basketball player and twin brother of Cody Martin
Camilla Martin (born 1974), retired Danish badminton player, now TV presenter
Carmi Martin (born 1963), Filipino actress
Catherine Martin (director) (born 1958), Canadian screenwriter and director
Charles Martin (American football) (1959–2005), professional American football player
Charles Martin (author) (born 1969), author from the Southern United States
Chris Martin (born 1977), English singer and composer for the band Coldplay
Chris Martin (baseball) (born 1986), American baseball player
Chris Martin (footballer, born 1990) (born 1990), English footballer
Christy Martin (boxer) (born 1968), world champion woman boxer
Clare Martin (born 1952), Australian politician
Coco Martin (born 1981), Filipino actor, director, and film producer
Cody Martin (basketball) (born 1995), American basketball player and twin brother of fellow player Caleb Martin
Corbin Martin (born 1995), American baseball player
Craig Martin (Canadian soccer) (born 1957), Canadian football (soccer) player
Craig Martin (South African soccer) (born 1993), South African soccer player
Curtis Martin (born 1973), American football player
Damian Martin (born 1984), Australian basketballer
Dan Martin (cyclist) (born 1986), Irish road bicycle racer
Darrick Martin (born 1971), American basketball player and coach
David Martin (Scottish politician) (born 1954), Scottish politician, MEP
Davis Martin (born 1997), American baseball player
Demetri Martin (born 1973), Greek-American comedian
Duane Martin (born 1965), American actor
Dustin Martin (born 1991), Australian rules footballer
Eric Martin (musician) (born 1960), American musician (Mr. Big)
Ersen Martin (born 1979), Turkish football player
Fergus Martin (born 1955), Irish artist
Gavin Martin (1961–2022), Northern Irish music journalist
Hans-Peter Martin (born 1957), Austrian journalist and MEP
Jacob Martin (American football) (born 1995), American football player
Jacques Martin (ice hockey) (born 1952), Canadian ice hockey coach
James Martin (chef) (born 1972), British celebrity chef
Jamie Martin (American football) (born 1970), American Football player
Jan Martín (born 1984), German-Israeli-Spanish basketball player
 Jarell Martin (born 1994), American basketball player for Maccabi Tel Aviv
Javier Martín de Villa (born 1981), Spanish ski mountaineer
Jenna Martin (born 1988), Canadian track and field athlete
Jenna Martin (curler) (born 1993 as Jenna Haag), American female curler
Jesse Martin (born 1981), Australian yachtsman
Jessica Martin (born 1962), British actor and comedian
José Miguel González Martín (born 1963), Spanish football player
Josie Martin (born 1988), American music producer
Kamal Martin (born 1998), American football player
Keith Martin (musician) (1966–2022), American R&B singer-songwriter
Keith Martin (politician) (born 1960), Canadian physician and politician
Kelan Martin (born 1995), American basketball player
Kellie Martin (born 1975), American actress
Ken Martin (athlete) (born 1958), American long-distance runner
Ken Martin (Australian sculptor) (born 1952) South Australian sculptor, noted for bronze statues
Kenyon Martin (born 1977), American basketball player
Kevin Martin (basketball, born 1983) (born 1983), American basketball player
Kim Martin (born 1986), Swedish female ice hockey goalkeeper
Koda Martin (born 1995), American football player
Lee Martin (footballer, born February 1968), Manchester United and Celtic footballer
Lee Martin (footballer, born September 1968), Huddersfield Town and Rochdale footballer
Lee Martin (footballer, born 1987), Manchester United and Rangers footballer
Leonys Martín (born 1988), Cuban-American professional baseball player
Lucas Martin (born 1968), soccer player
Luke Martin (born 1981), Australian professional basketball player
Madeleine Martin (born 1993), American actress
Mandy Martin (1952–2021), Australian artist
Margaret V. Martin (bodybuilder) (born 1979), American professional bodybuilder
María Ángeles Martín Prats (born 1971), Spanish engineer and entrepreneur
Marialejandra Martín (born 1964), Venezuelan actress
Marilyn Martin (born 1954), American singer
Mark Martin (born 1959), American stock car racing driver
Mark Martin (cartoonist) (born 1956), American cartoonist
Mark Martin (judge) (born 1963), American judge
Markko Märtin (born 1975), Estonian rally driver
Matt Martin (ice hockey) (born 1989), Canadian ice hockey player
Max Martin (born 1971), Swedish musician and producer
Meaghan Martin (born 1992), American actress and singer
Micheál Martin (born 1960), Irish politician
Michelle Martin (born 1967), Australian squash player
Mike Martin (politician) (born 1952), Texas politician
Noël Martin (1959–2020), Jamaican-English paraplegic, victim of Neo-Nazi attack
Pamela Martin (television reporter) (born 1953), American-born Canadian news anchor
Pamela Sue Martin (born 1954), American actress
Pat Martin (born 1955), Canadian New Democratic Party Member of Parliament
Pat Martin (born 1957), American radio broadcaster
 Patrick Martin (born 1983), American professional wrestler better known as Alex Shelley
Paul Merton (born 1957 as Paul Martin), British actor and comedian
Peter Martin (disambiguation): several people including:
Peter Martin (athlete) (born 1962), Paralympian athlete from New Zealand
Peter Martin (cricketer) (born 1968), English cricketer
Peter Martin (darts player) (born 1975), Slovak darts player
Peter Martin (economist) (born c. 1980), Australian commentator on economics
Peter Martin (English footballer) (born 1950), English footballer with Darlington and Barnsley
Peter Martin (jazz pianist) (born 1970), American jazz pianist
Peter Martin (photographer) (born c. 1960), Canadian photographer
Remy Martin (basketball) (born 1998), American basketball player
Richard Martin (Canadian director) (born 1956), Canadian film director
Richard Martin (footballer, born 1962), French football player
Richard Martin (footballer, born 1987), English football player
Richie Martin (born 1994), American baseball player
Rick Martin (1951–2011) born Richard Martin, Canadian ice-hockey player
Ricky Martin (born 1971), Puerto Rican singer
Robert Martin (disambiguation), several people, including
Roger Martin (professor) (born 1956), Dean, Rotman School of Management, University of Toronto
Roland S. Martin (born 1968), American journalist
Russell Martin (baseball) (born 1983), Canadian professional baseball catcher
Sandor Martin (born 1993), Spanish boxer
Tee Martin (born 1978), American football player and coach
Stefan Martin (born 1986), Australian rules footballer
Tay Martin (born 1997), American football player
Tisha Campbell-Martin (born 1968), American actress
Todd Martin (born 1970), American tennis player
Tony Martin (Australian actor) (born 1953), best known for Wildside TV series
Tony Martin (comedian) (born 1964), Australian comedian
Tony Martin (cyclist) (born 1985), German road bicycle racer
Trayvon Martin (1995–2012), American high school student killed in Florida
Tyrese Martin (born 1999), American basketball player
 Vincent Martin (born 1960), birth name of Vince Clarke, English musician, songwriter, Erasure
 Wayne Martin (Branch Davidian) (c. 1951–1993), birth name Douglas Wayne Martin, American lawyer and Branch Davidian
 Wayne Martin (judge) (born 1952), Australian lawyer and judge
 Wayne Martin (American football) (born 1965), birth name Gerald Wayne Martin, American football player
 Wayne Martin (footballer) (born 1965), English footballer
Wes Martin (born 1996), American football player
William Martin (disambiguation), several people

Born since 2000
Jartavius Martin (born 2000), American football player
Kenyon Martin Jr. (born 2001), American basketball player
Luka Yoshida-Martin (born 2001), Australian rules footballer

Birth year missing, possibly living
Barrie Martin, English footballer
Bob Martin (curler), English curler
Edith T. Martin, American artist and museum professional
Jane Martin (public servant) (fl. 2021), British public servant
Jeff Martin (tenor), American operatic tenor
Jerry Martin (composer), American jazz, New Age and video game composer
Saige Martin, American artist and politician
Peter W. Martin, professor at Cornell Law School
 Ronnie Martin, American musician, records as Joy Electric
Wednesday Martin, American writer

Derived surnames
They generally mean "descendant of Martin".

Marcin, Marcinkiewicz in Polish
Martí (disambiguation) in Catalan
Martínez (disambiguation), Spanish
Martins (disambiguation) in Portuguese and Galician
Martini (disambiguation), Martino (disambiguation), Martin (disambiguation), Martinis, De/Di Martini and De/Di Martino in Italian
Martini (disambiguation) and Martinaj in Albanian
Maarten and Martijn (disambiguation) in Dutch
Martens (disambiguation) in German and Dutch
Martinsson in Swedish
Martinsen in Danish and Norwegian
Martinescu, Marin (disambiguation), Marian (disambiguation) in Romanian
Martinčič in Slovenian
Martinić and Martinčić in Croatian
Martinović in Serbian and Croatian
Martinec in Czech and Croatian
Martínek in Czech
Martinev in Russian and Bulgarian
Martinov (disambiguation) in Bulgarian
Marton (disambiguation), Mártonfi and Mártonffy in Hungarian
Martinski in several Slavic languages
Martinsons in Latvian
McMartin (disambiguation) in Scottish
Martyn (surname), Marten and Martinson in English
Martynenko, Martyniuk, and Martyniv in Ukrainian
Martinavičius, Marcinkevičius, and Martynas in Lithuanian
Mac Giolla Mhártain (Gilmartin, Kilmartin or Martin): hereditary chiefs in the barony of Clogher, Co. Tyrone in Ireland and are a branch of the O'Neills
Ó Máirtín (Martin): Irish clan

Given/first name 
Those people who are known primarily by the name "Martin" are listed below.

Born before 1700 
 Martin Akakia (1500–1551), physician of King Francis I of France
 Martin Bucer (1491–1551), Protestant reformer
 Martín Cortés (son of Malinche) aka "El Mestizo" (c. 1523–1595), first recorded Mexican Mestizo, son of Hernán Cortés and La Malinche
 Martín de Porres (1579–1639), Catholic patron saint of people of mixed race
 Martin Frobisher (c. 1535–1594), English privateer, explorer and admiral
 Martín García Óñez de Loyola (1549–1598), Spanish Basque soldier and Royal Governor of Chile
 Martin Guerre (c. 1524–1560), French peasant who left his wife, child, and village and returned after an imposter had assumed his place
 Martin Luther (1483–1546), founder of Protestantism
 Martin I of Sicily (c. 1374–1409), ruled 1390–1409
 Martin of Aragon (1356–1410), ruled 1396–1410, also Martin II of Sicily, 1409–1410
 Martin of Braga (c. 520–580), archbishop of Braga
 Martin of Leon (c. 1130–1203), Spanish saint and Augustinian canon
 Pope Marinus I (also known as Pope Martin II), Pope (882–884)
 Pope Marinus II (also known as Pope Martin III) (?-946), Pope (942–946)
 Pope Martin I (?-655), Saint and Pope (649–655)
 Pope Martin IV (c. 1210 – 1285), Pope (1281–1285), born Simon de Brion
 Pope Martin V (c. 1368 – 1431), Pope (1417–31), born Odo Colona
 Saint Marinus (also known as Martin) (?-c.366), namesake of San Marino

Born 1700–1799 
 Martin Nürenbach (died 1780), German acrobat, stage actor, dancer and equilibrist
 Martín Rodríguez (politician) (1771–1845), Argentine politician
 Martin Van Buren (1782–1862), 8th president of the United States of America

Born 1800–1899 
 Martin A. Maland (1846–1944), American businessman, farmer, and politician
 Martin Aagaard (1863–1913), Norwegian painter
 Martin Buber (1878–1965), Israeli philosopher, translator, and educator
 Martin Dunbar-Nasmith (1883–1965), English Royal Navy officer
 Martin Fitzgerald (politician) (1867–1927), Irish Senator
 Martin Heidegger (1889–1976), German philosopher
 Martin Kennedy (New Zealand politician) (1836–1916), MP from Westland, New Zealand
 Martin J. Kennedy (1892–1955), U.S. Representative from New York
 Martin Kennedy (hurler) (1898–1983), Irish hurler
 Martin Klein (wrestler) (1884–1947), Estonian wrestler
 Martin Lipp (1854–1923), Estonian poet
 Martin A. Meyer (1879–1923), American rabbi
 Martin Miller (actor) (1899–1969), Czech actor
 Martinus Thomsen (1890–1981), pen name Martinus

Born 1900–1999 
 Martin Ahlgren (1975-), Swedish cinematographer
 Martin Amlin (1953-), American composer and pianist 
 Martin Andanar (1974-), Filipino news anchor, radio commentator, and voice-over artist
 Martin Armiger (1949–2019), Australian musician, member of the rock band The Sports
 Martin Atkins (1959-), English drummer
 Martin Axenrot (1979-), drummer for Opeth
 Martin Bartenstein (1953-), Austrian businessman and politician
 Martin Bieber (1900–1974), German General and Knight's Cross recipient 
 Martin Bormann (1900–1945), Nazi official, head of the Parteikanzlei
 Martin Breunig (1992-), German basketball player
 Martin Bridson (1964-), Manx mathematician
 Martin Brodeur (1972-), Canadian ice hockey player and Olympic Gold Medal winner
 Martin Brudermüller (1961-), German businessman, CEO of BASF
 Martin Brundle (1959-), English auto racing driver and commentator
 Martin Bryant (1967-), Australian spree killer and perpetrator of the 1996 Port Arthur massacre
 Martín Cáceres (1987-), Uruguayan footballer
 Martin Cattalini (1973-), retired Australian basketballer
 Martin Clunes (1961-), British actor
 Martin Compston (1984-), Scottish actor and professional footballer
 Martin Cooper (inventor) (1928-), American inventor of the mobile phone
 Martin Damm (1972-), Czech tennis player
 Martin Davis (tennis) (1958-), Blackman's American compatriot and tennis player
 Martin del Rosario (1991-), Filipino model and actor
 Martin van Drunen (1966-), Dutch death metal vocalist/musician
 Martin Dzúr (1919–1985), Czechoslovak army general and defense minister (1968–1985)
 Martin Eberts (1957-), German diplomat
 Martin Ebner (1945-), Swiss billionaire businessman
 Martin Erat (1981-), Czech professional ice hockey player
 E-Type (musician) Martin Eriksson (1965-), Swedish musician
 Martin Eriksson (1971-), Swedish pole vaulter
 Martin Filipovski (1986-), guitarist for Macedonian rock band Next Time
 Martin Fillo (1986-), Czech professional footballer
 Martin Fitzgerald (hurler) (1991-), Irish hurler
 Martin S. Fox (1924–2020), American publisher 
 Martin Freeman (1971-), English actor
 Martín García (Peruvian footballer) (1970-), Peruvian footballer
 Martín García (footballer, born 1976) (1976-), Uruguayan footballer
 Martín García (tennis) (1977-), Argentine tennis player
 Martín García (footballer, born 1981) (1981-), Colombian footballer
 Martin Garcia (jockey) (1984-), Mexican-born jockey in American horse racing
 Martín García García (1996-), Spanish classical pianist
 Martín García (footballer, born 1998) (1998-), Argentine footballer
 Martin Gardner (1914–2010), American writer on mathematics, magic, science and puzzles
 Martin Garrix (1996-), Dutch musician
 Marty Glickman (1917–2001), American athlete and radio announcer
 Martin Goodman (historian) (1953-), British historian and academic
 Martin Goodman (publisher) (1908–1992), American publisher of pulp magazines and comic books
 Martin J. Goodman (1956-), English author and journalist
 Martin Wise Goodman (1935–1981), Canadian journalist, editor-in-chief of The Toronto Star
 Martin Gore (1961-), British singer and songwriter (Depeche Mode)
 Marty Grebb (1945–2020), American musician, member of The Buckinghams
 Martin Grohe (1967-), German mathematician and computer scientist
 Martin Grossman (1965–2010), American murderer
 Martin Haese (born 1965), Australian politician
 Martin Harris (swimmer) (born 1969), English backstroke swimmer
 Martin Häusling (born 1961), German politician
 Martin Hoberg Hedegaard (born 1992), Danish singer
 Martin Heinrich (1971-), American politician and Senator from New Mexico
 Martin Hengel (1926–2009), German theologian
 Martin Hinteregger (1992-), Austrian footballer
 Martin Horntveth (1977-), Norwegian musician
 Martin van der Horst (1965-), Dutch volleyball player
 Martin Hurt (1984-), Estonian football defender or midfielder
 Martín Jaite (1964-), Argentine tennis player
 Martin Jarmond (1980-), American college sports administrator and former basketball player
 Martin Jarvis (actor) (1941-), British-American voice actor
 Martin Johnson (rugby union) (1970-), English rugby union player
 Martin Kaalma (1977-), Estonian football goalkeeper
 Martin Kennedy (composer) (1978-), English composer of contemporary classical music
 Martin Kennedy (rugby league) (1989-), Australian professional rugby league footballer
 Martin Luther King Jr. (1929–1968), American civil rights campaigner
 Martin Kippenberger (1953–1997), German painter
 Martin J. Klein (1924–2009), American science historian
 Martin Kližan (1989-), Slovak tennis player
 Martin Kohlroser (1905–1967), German Waffen-SS commander during World War II
 Martin Koopman (1956-), Dutch footballer and football manager
 Martin Kratt (1965-), American educational nature show host
 Martin Kukk (1987-),  Estonian politician
 Martin Kupper (1989-), Estonian discus thrower
 Martin Lang (fencer) (1949-), American Olympic fencer
 Martin Lang (rugby league) (1975-), Australian rugby league footballer
 Martin Laurendeau (1964-), Canadian tennis player
 Martin Lawrence (1965-), American television and movie actor
 Martin Lee (tennis) (1978-), British tennis player
 Martin van Leeuwen (1981-), Dutch football (soccer) player
 Martin Lewis (financial journalist) (1972-), English financial journalist and broadcaster
 Martin C. Libicki (1952-), American academic
 Martin Loo (1988-), Estonian cross-country mountain biker
 Martin Lopez (1978-), Swedish-Uruguayan drummer for death metal band Opeth
 Martin Mayhew (1965-), American football player and executive
 Martin McGuinness (1950–2017), deputy First Minister of Northern Ireland and erstwhile member of the Provisional Irish Republican Army
 Martin Meehan (Irish republican) (1945–2007), Sinn Féin politician and erstwhile member of the Provisional Irish Republican Army
 Martín Méndez (1978-), bass player for progressive death metal band Opeth
 Martin Miller (cricketer, born 1972) (1972-), English cricketer
 Martin Miller (footballer) (1997-), Estonian footballer
 Martín Mondragón (1953-), Mexican long-distance runner
 Martin Moss (businessman) (1923–2007), British managing director of London department store Woollands
 Martin Moss (American football) (1958-), American football defensive end
 Martin Müürsepp (1974-), Estonian professional basketball player
 Martin Nievera (1962-), Filipino singer
 Martin Ødegaard (1998-), Norwegian football player
 Martin Offiah (1966-), British rugby league footballer
 Martin O'Hagan (1950–2001), Irish journalist
 Martin O'Malley (1963-), Mayor of Baltimore and Governor of Maryland
 Martin O'Neill (1952-), retired footballer and manager
 Martin O'Neill, Baron O'Neill of Clackmannan (1945–2020), Scottish politician
 Martin O'Neill (footballer, born 1975) (1975-), former Scottish footballer
 Martin O'Neill (hurler) (1992-), Irish hurler in
 Martin Paasoja (1993-), Estonian basketball player
 Martin Padar (1979-), Estonian judoka
 Martin Patching (1958-), English footballer
 Martin Perscheid (1966–2021), German cartoonist
 Martin Petrov (1979-), Bulgarian footballer
 Martin Reed (1978-), English footballer
 Martin Reeves aka "Krafty Kuts" (c.1977-), British musician
 Martin Reim (1971-), Estonian football midfielder
 Marty Robbins Martin Robbins (1925–1982), American singer-songwriter 
 Martín Emilio Rodríguez (1942-), Colombian cyclist
 Martin Rodriguez (c. 1950-), drummer of the 1970s band Captain Beyond
 Martín Rodríguez (footballer, born 1968) (1968-), Peruvian footballer
 Martín Rodríguez (tennis) (1969-), Argentine tennis player
 Martín Rodríguez (footballer, born 1970) (1970-), Uruguayan footballer
 Martín Rodríguez (sailor) (1974-), Argentine Olympic sailor
 Martín Rodríguez (rugby union) (1985-), Argentine rugby union player
 Martín Rodríguez (footballer, born 1985) (1985-), Uruguayan footballer
 Martín Rodríguez (footballer, born 1989) (1989-), Uruguayan footballer
 Martín Rodríguez (Chilean footballer) (1994-), Chilean footballer
 Martín Sastre (1976-), Uruguayan artist
 Martin Scharlemann (1948-), American mathematician
 Martin Schenkel (1968–2003), Swiss actor and musician
 Martin Scherber (1907–1974), German composer
 Martin Schulz (1955-), German politician
 Martin Scorsese (1942-), American filmmaker
 Martin Seiferth (1990-), German basketball player
 Martin Semmelrogge (1955-), German actor 
 Martin Sheen (1940-), American actor
 Martin Shkreli (1983-), American former financial executive and convicted criminal
 Martin Short (1950-), Canadian-American comedian
 Martin Silva (1952-), Canadian politician and radio personality
 Martin Sinner (1968-), German tennis player
 Martin Škrtel (1984-), Slovak football defender
 Martin St. Louis (1975-), Canadian ice hockey player
 Martin Steele (1962-), British middle-distance runner
 Martin Strel (1954-), Slovenian marathon swimmer
 Martin Johnsrud Sundby (1984-), Norwegian cross-country skier
 Martin Taupau (1990-), New Zealand Rugby League player
 Martin Teffer (1965-), Dutch volleyball player and coach
 Martin Tešovič (1974-), Slovak weightlifter
 Martin Tungevaag (1993-), Norwegian DJ
 Martín Vassallo Argüello (1980-), Argentine tennis player
 Martin Verkerk (1978-), Dutch former tennis player
 Martin Viiask (1983-), Estonian professional basketballer
 Martín Vizcarra (1963-), Peruvian politician and former president of Peru
 Martin Vunk (1984-), Estonian football midfielder
 Martin Walsh (film editor) (1955-), Academy Award-winning film editor
 Martin Gottfried Weiss (1905–1946), SS Commander of German concentration camps executed for war crimes
 Martin Winterkorn (1947-), German automobile manager 
 Martin Zijlstra (1944–2014), Dutch politician

Pseudonyms 
 Martín, nom de guerre of Gaspar García Laviana) (1941–1978)

Middle name
 Ejnar Martin Kjær (1893–1947), Danish politician 
 Johann Martin Miller (1750–1814), German theologian and writer
 Juan Martín del Potro (1988-), Vassallo Argüello's Argentine compatriot and tennis player
 N. M. Perera N. Martin Perera (1904–1979), Sri Lankan Sinhala Trotskyist

Fictional characters
 Captain Martin Walker, protagonist of Spec Ops: The Line
 Martin, in the miniseries V (1983 miniseries)
 Martin Blackwood, from the podcast The Magnus Archives
 Chief Martin Brody, Chief of Police in Jaws (franchise)
 Martin, from the 1759 Voltaire novel Candide
 Martin Chuzzlewit, from the novel by Charles Dickens
 Martin Crane, from the American sitcom Frasier
 Martín Fierro, Argentinian gaucho in epic of the same name
 Martin Fitzgerald (Passions), in the daytime drama Passions
 Martin Fitzgerald (Without a Trace), in the crime drama Without a Trace
 Martin Fowler (EastEnders), from the English soap opera Eastenders
 Martin Goodman, in the British sitcom Friday Night Dinner
 Martin Li, secret identity of Marvel Comics''' supervillain Mister Negative.
 Dr. Martin Heiss, in Ghostbusters (2016 film) Martin Kennedy, character in Retreat (film)
 Martin Prince, from the American animated television program The Simpsons Zack and Cody Martin, from the sitcom The Suite Life of Zack and Cody Martin family (All My Children), from the soap opera All My Children Marty McFly Martin "Marty" McFly, protagonist of the Back to the Future franchise
 Theo Martin, character in Power Rangers Jungle Fury Uncle Martin, title character from the American sitcom My Favorite Martian Martin Mystery (Martin Mystère), eponymous protagonist of Martin Mystery Martin Payne, title character from the American sitcom Martin
 Commander Martin Servaz, protagonist of the French The Frozen Dead (TV series)
 Martin Septim, from The Elder Scrolls IV: Oblivion Martin Stein, from DC Comics
 Martin Tanley,  in the 1997 American martial arts comedy film Beverly Hills Ninja Martin Walker, antagonist in the 2013 action film White House Down Martin, also known as Martin the Warrior, character from Redwall Sergeant Martin Riggs, in the 1987 American film Lethal Weapon''

See also
Martina (given name)
Martina (surname)
Martínez (surname)

References

Latin masculine given names
Bulgarian masculine given names
Czech masculine given names
Danish masculine given names
Dutch masculine given names
English masculine given names
English-language surnames
Estonian masculine given names
French masculine given names
French-language surnames
German masculine given names
German-language surnames
Masculine given names
Norwegian masculine given names
Patronymic surnames
Slovak masculine given names
Swedish masculine given names
Surnames from given names